This is a list of casinos in Delaware. Delaware is home to three casinos, all of which are racinos.

List of casinos

See also
 List of casino hotels  
 List of casinos in the United States

References

External links
 

 
Casinos 
Delaware